Abenteuer Archäologie (meaning Adventure Archeology in English) was a German archaeological and science magazine. The magazine was founded in February 2004 and was published by Spektrum der Wissenschaft Verlagsgesellschaft mbH in Heidelberg. Its editor was Reinhard Breuer. The magazine was merged with Epoch magazine in 2012.

See also
List of magazines in Germany

References

2004 establishments in Germany
2012 disestablishments in Germany
Defunct magazines published in Germany
German-language magazines
Magazines established in 2004
Magazines disestablished in 2012
Mass media in Heidelberg